Oz: The Soundtrack is the soundtrack to the HBO television series, Oz. It was released on January 9, 2001, through Avatar Records and contained hip hop music from all three coasts, East, West and South. The album peaked at #1 on the Billboard Soundtrack Chart, #8 on the Top R&B/Hip-Hop Albums, and #42 on the Billboard 200 and spawned the single "Behind the Walls, which peaked at #52 on the Hot R&B/Hip-Hop Singles & Tracks.

Track listing

Charts

Weekly charts

Year-end charts

References

Hip hop soundtracks
Television soundtracks
Albums produced by Swizz Beatz
2001 soundtrack albums
Albums produced by True Master
Albums produced by Mike Dean (record producer)
Albums produced by Domingo (producer)
Gangsta rap soundtracks